Mapumulo is a town in eThekwini Metropolitan Municipality in the KwaZulu-Natal province of South Africa.

References

Populated places in eThekwini Metropolitan Municipality